Carroll County Courthouse or Carroll County Court House may refer to:

 Carroll County Courthouse, Eastern District, Berryville, Arkansas
 Carroll County Courthouse (Georgia), Carrollton, Georgia
 Carroll County Courthouse (Illinois), Mount Carroll, Illinois
 Carroll County Courthouse (Indiana), Delphi, Indiana
 Carroll County Courthouse (Iowa), Carroll, Iowa
 Carroll County Courthouse (Kentucky), in the Carrollton Historic District, Carrollton, Kentucky
 Carroll County Courthouse (Carrollton, Mississippi), a Mississippi Landmark
 Old Carroll County Courthouse (Vaiden, Mississippi), a Mississippi Landmark
 Carroll County Court House (Missouri), Carrollton, Missouri
 Carroll County Court House (New Hampshire), Ossipee, New Hampshire
 Carroll County Courthouse (Ohio), Carrollton, Ohio
 Carroll County Courthouse (Virginia), Hillsville, Virginia